Endeodes is a genus of soft-winged flower beetles in the family Melyridae. There are about six described species in Endeodes.

Species
These six species belong to the genus Endeodes:
 Endeodes basalis LeConte, 1853
 Endeodes blaisdelli Moore, 1954
 Endeodes collaris LeConte, 1853
 Endeodes insularis Blackwelder, 1932
 Endeodes rugiceps Blackwelder, 1932
 Endeodes terminalis Marshall, 1957

References

Further reading

 

Melyridae
Cleroidea genera
Articles created by Qbugbot